María Florencia Mutio (born 20 November 1984) is an Argentine field hockey player. At the 2012 Summer Olympics, she competed for the Argentina field hockey team where the team achieved the silver medal. Florencia also won one Champions Trophy, the bronze medal at the 2014 World Cup and two Pan American Cups.

References

External links 
 

1984 births
Living people
Argentine female field hockey players
Female field hockey goalkeepers
Olympic field hockey players of Argentina
Field hockey players at the 2012 Summer Olympics
Olympic medalists in field hockey
Las Leonas players
Olympic silver medalists for Argentina
Medalists at the 2012 Summer Olympics
Field hockey players at the 2015 Pan American Games
Pan American Games silver medalists for Argentina
Field hockey players at the 2016 Summer Olympics
Pan American Games medalists in field hockey
People from Paraná, Entre Ríos
Expatriate field hockey players
Argentine expatriate sportspeople in Italy
Argentine expatriate sportspeople in Spain
Medalists at the 2015 Pan American Games
Sportspeople from Entre Ríos Province
20th-century Argentine women
21st-century Argentine women